The China Aerospace Studies Institute (CASI) is a United States Department of the Air Force think tank which examines all facets of the People's Republic of China and Chinese Communist Party's efforts to project power in the air and space domains. Part of Air University, it provides support to the Air Force, the Space Force, the joint services, civilian federal agencies, and academic research institutions.

History 
The China Aerospace Studies Institute began in 2017 as a resource to examine Chinese aerospace power projection. It was officially chartered by General Charles Q. Brown Jr. in July 2021, in order to increase awareness of Chinese aerospace capabilities, and "learn what makes them tick" as competition between the United States and China has increased.

Mission 

The mission of the institute is to advance understanding of the capabilities, development, operating concepts, strategy, doctrine, personnel, organization, and limitations of China's aerospace forces, which include: the PLA Air Force (PLAAF); PLA Naval Aviation (PLAN Aviation); PLA Army Aviation; PLA Rocket Force (PLARF); the Strategic Support Force (PLASSF), primarily space and cyber; and the civilian and commercial infrastructure that supports all of the preceding units.

CASI supports the Secretary of the Air Force, Joint Chiefs of Staff, and other senior leaders of the Air and Space Forces. CASI provides expert research and analysis supporting decision and policy makers in the Department of Defense and across the U.S. government.

Key functions 

CASI accomplishes its mission through conducting the following activities:  

 CASI primarily conducts open-source native-language research supporting its five main topic areas.
 CASI conducts conferences, workshops, roundtables, subject matter expert panels, and senior leader discussions to further its mission.  CASI personnel attend such events, government, academic, and public, in support of its research and outreach efforts.
 CASI publishes research findings and papers, journal articles, monographs, and edited volumes for both public and government-only distribution as appropriate.
 CASI establishes and maintains institutional relationships with organizations and institutions in the PLA, the People's Republic of China writ large, and with partners and allies involved in the region.
 CASI maintains the ability to support senior leaders and policy decision makers across the full spectrum of topics and projects at all levels, related to Chinese aerospace.

CASI supports the U.S. Defense Department and the China research community writ-large by providing unclassified research on Chinese aerospace developments in the context of U.S. strategic imperatives in the Asia-Pacific region. Primarily focused on China’s Military Air, Space, and Missile Forces, CASI capitalizes on publicly available native language resources to gain insights as to how the Chinese speak to and among one another on these topics.

CASI aims to fill a niche in the China research community by providing unclassified research on Chinese aerospace developments in the context of U.S. strategic imperatives in the Asia-Pacific region.

References 

Air University (United States Air Force)
Think tanks
Think tanks based in the United States